Dalian Greenland Center is a skyscraper under construction  in Dalian, Liaoning, China. It is expected to have 88 floors and be 518 m tall. The anticipated completion date is currently unknown.
When built, Dalian Greenland Center will become the tallest building in Dalian.

See also
 List of tallest buildings in China
 List of tallest buildings in Dalian

References

Skyscrapers in Dalian
Buildings and structures under construction in China
Skyscraper office buildings in China
Residential skyscrapers in China
Skyscraper hotels in China